The Friendship Medal is, alongside the Medal of the Republic, the People's Republic of China's highest order of honour. On December 27, 2015, the National People's Congress Standing Committee (NPCSC) passed a law establishing two national medals, the Medal of the Republic and the Friendship Medal, constituted on January 1, 2016.

The Friendship Medal is bestowed on foreigners who have made outstanding contributions to China's socialist modernization, the promotion of exchange and cooperation between China and foreign countries, and the protection of world peace. All the recipients have cooperated and participated actively in supporting China's social, cultural, economic and international developments to various degrees.

The first Friendship Medal was awarded by President Xi Jinping to Vladimir Putin, President of Russia, on June 8, 2018.

History 
In August 2015, the 16th session of the Standing Committee of the Twelfth National People's Congress first considered the Law of the People's Republic of China on National Medals and National Honorary Titles (Draft).

In December 2015, the 18th session of the Standing Committee of the Twelfth National People's Congress was held in Beijing, where the Law of the People's Republic of China on National Medals and National Honorary Titles (Draft) was considered for the second time. In January 2016, the Law of the People's Republic of China on National Medals and National Honorary Titles was finally issued, which established the Friendship Medal.

In June 2018, the first Friendship Medal was awarded. With the approval of the Central Committee of the Chinese Communist Party (CCP), the ceremony of awarding the state medals and state honors of the People's Republic of China was held in the Great Hall. The President of the People's Republic of China, CCP General Secretary, and Chairman of the Central Military Commission attended the ceremony, and both made speeches.

Appearance 
The major colors used for the Friendship Medal are gold and blue. The body of the medal adopted various elements; a dove which represents peace and love is placed at the centre of the medal plate, whereas earth is also engraved on the bottom of the dove, followed by a sign of hand-shaking that symbolises the friendly attitude from China to other countries. The medal plate is surrounded by lotus petals, a flower that represents pureness, peace and harmony in traditional Chinese culture. Likewise, even more, traditional elements can be observed from the chain of the Friendship Medal. This includes the use of Chinese decorative knots (solidarity), peony flowers (wealth/prosperity), jade (earth) and auspicious clouds (luck/fortune). All those symbolic elements not only represent the richness of traditional Chinese cultures but also convey China's wish for common prosperity and development globally.

The whole medal is handmade with traditional crafts. An example could be the filigree inlay, which is also known as the fine gold arts. Such a heritage crafting technique can be spotted especially on the lotus petals as well as the engraved golden symbols. Another worth-noting technique is silk-pinching enamel, which is used to craft most of the blue parts of the Friendship Medal. The colour blue not only stood out from the rest of the gold medals, but it is also used to adorn the calm and stable colour symbolism within the traditional Chinese culture.

Policies and regulations 

According to the Law of the People's Republic of China on National Medals and National Honorary Titles, state medals and state honours can be awarded posthumously. Any recipient who has made outstanding contributions during their lifetime and meets the conditions for awarding the Friendship Medal as stipulated in this law and who dies before the implementation may be awarded state medals and state honors posthumously.

In addition, state medals and state honours are for the lifetime of their recipients but can also be revoked. The Standing Committee of the National People's Congress (NPCSC) has the right to revoke the Friendship Medal if the recipient has been sentenced to imprisonment for a crime or has committed other serious violations of the law or discipline. Such a continued enjoyment of the state medals and state honors could seriously damage the reputation of the highest national honor. Therefore, the NPCSC would hold meetings emergently to discuss and vote for the cancellation of that specific Friendship Medal.

If the recipient of state medals and state honours dies, the medals, awards and certificates received by him/her shall be kept by his/her heirs or designees; if there are no heirs or designees, they may be collected and stored by the state.

Recipients

See also 
Orders, decorations, and medals of China

References

External links 
 

Orders, decorations, and medals of the People's Republic of China